Katalin Haász (born 1 December 1966) is a Hungarian diver. She competed in the women's 3 metre springboard event at the 1988 Summer Olympics.

References

External links
 

1966 births
Living people
Hungarian female divers
Olympic divers of Hungary
Divers at the 1988 Summer Olympics
Divers from Budapest
Sportspeople from Budapest